Ethandrostate, also known as ethinylandrostenediol 3β-cyclohexanepropionate, is a synthetic steroidal estrogen and ester of ethinylandrostenediol (17α-ethynyl-5-androstenediol) which was developed and studied in people with certain cancers like breast cancer and prostate cancer in the 1950s but was never marketed. Although far less potent by weight than estradiol or estrone, ethandrostate produces estrogenic effects in the vagina, uterus, and mammary glands as well as antigonadotropic and secondary antiandrogenic effects like testicular and prostate atrophy in both animals and humans. Ethandrostate was assessed in humans as an aqueous suspension by intramuscular injection at doses of 100 to 200 mg/day or 100 mg three times per week and by mouth at a dose of 25 mg four times per day. It shows much greater antigonadotropic potency relative to general estrogenic potency in animals when compared with other estrogens. However, this doesn't seem to be the case in humans. In addition to its estrogenic activity, ethandrostate has very weak androgenic activity that manifests only at doses much higher than its estrogenic activity.

References

Abandoned drugs
Ethynyl compounds
Androgens and anabolic steroids
Androstanes
Antigonadotropins
Diols
Esters
Experimental cancer drugs
Progestogens
Synthetic estrogens